Apple Grove is an unincorporated community in Meigs County, Ohio, United States.

History
A post office called Apple Grove was established in 1850, and remained in operation until 1938. The community was named for an apple orchard near the original town site.

Notable person
Warren Miller, West Virginia congressman

Notes

Unincorporated communities in Meigs County, Ohio
Unincorporated communities in Ohio
Ohio populated places on the Ohio River